The Bascov is a right tributary of the river Argeș in Romania. It discharges into the Argeș near Pitești. It flows through the villages Bunești, Bascovele, Negești, Ursoaia, Dumbrăvești, Drăganu-Olteni, Prislopu Mare, Valea Ursului, Brăileni, Uiasca and Bascov.

References

Rivers of Romania
Rivers of Argeș County